The following are the dams and reservoirs located in Goa:

References

Dams
Goa
Goa
 
Lists of tourist attractions in Goa